The ninth season of Stargate SG-1, an American-Canadian television series, began airing on July 15, 2005 on SCI FI. The ninth season concluded on March 10, 2006, after 20 episodes on the same channel. The series was originally developed by Brad Wright and Jonathan Glassner, and Brad Wright, Robert C. Cooper, Joseph Mallozzi and Paul Mullie served as executive producers. The season arc centers on the new threat of the Ori, a race who Daniel Jackson (Michael Shanks) and Vala Mal Doran (Claudia Black) unleash  in an unknown galaxy, and who are threatening to prepare for a crusade into the Milky Way galaxy to convert the beings to their religion called Origin.

Season nine regular cast members included Ben Browder, Amanda Tapping, Christopher Judge, Beau Bridges, and Michael Shanks. Claudia Black appeared in a recurring role for eight episodes. The ninth season begins with General Hank Landry (Beau Bridges) having assumed command of Stargate Command, and newcomer Lt. Col. Cameron Mitchell (Ben Browder) trying to regroup the SG-1 team after the events of the eighth season.

Production

Development
The burning of Vala in "Avalon (Part 2)" was a challenging sequence for safety reasons and for still making it believable. Stunt people stood in for the fire scenes that Claudia Black couldn't film. Locked-off cameras and different "plates" were later combined to so-called VisFX compshots. The episode "Crusade" was Robert C. Cooper's first time directing on the show. All of Vala's voiceovers in that episode were filmed beforehand so that the director could pick which parts would be voiceover and which parts would be shown.

Since the environment of Vancouver, British Columbia, Canada, where SG-1 and Atlantis were primarily filmed, was being developed, shooting locations were getting rarer for new offworld stories. The producers countered this with a new reusable village set, with almost 280 feet (85m) in length and 12000 sqfoot (1100 m²) in area, the biggest they ever built. It was an interior and exterior practical set on an effects stage. Three weeks passed between initial conception until building began, although portions had already been built the previous year. Two further weeks passed before filming began. The inspiration for the set were medieval villages, Japanese homes, and Italian structures and buildings. "The Ties That Bind" marks the first appearance of the Atlantis-style wormhole effect on the actual series, rather than in just the opening credits.

Cast
Ben Browder and Beau Bridges joined the main cast in Season 9, as Cameron Mitchell and Hank Landry, respectively. Richard Dean Anderson had left the main cast after Season 8 due to the personal wish to spend more time with his young daughter in Los Angeles. Despite being listed in the cast credits for the whole season and short scenes in Avalon (Part 1), Amanda Tapping as Samantha Carter is absent during the first five episodes as she was in the last stages of pregnancy at that time. Her empty spot was filled by guest star Claudia Black, who would leave in "Beachhead" and return for the last two episodes of Season 9, which involved her real-life pregnancy. Another new recurring actor was Lexa Doig as Carolyn Lam, Landry's daughter and the new doctor at Stargate Command.

Writing

After writing the end of Season 8 as the third series finale in a row and having a positive creative experience with the first season of Stargate Atlantis, the producers considered starting a new spin-off show called Stargate Command, but the Sci Fi Channel chose to renew the series into a ninth season. With the departure of Richard Dean Anderson, the producers then decided to start a new chapter and introduced new elements into the series. A major change was the departure from Egyptian mythology and the Goa'uld Empire which had found its climax in the season 8 episode "Threads", and the introduction of Arthurian mythology. "Avalon" was treated like a pilot film, consisting of originally two episodes, but a long script resulted in the extension of the story into the episode "Origin", in which the Ori make their first appearance as new antagonistic race.

The title of the episode "Ex Deus Machina" is a hyperbaton of "deus ex machina" (literally "God out of a Machine", meaning "God appearing on a crane", a literary device for a kind of turn of events) after he jokingly suggested to his writing partners a plot about Ba'al working undercover as a mechanic on Earth. The title also makes a reference to Ba'al as an ex-deus (a former god).

The episode "Ripple Effect" was overly long and had many scenes edited and cut for time. Writer Joseph Mallozzi later posted script sections of all cut scenes online. Asked what the cryptic remark by Black Mitchell meant when he left through the gate at the end of the episode, Mallozzi answered the meaning of this remark will not be revealed in the series but might come up in the Stargate SG-1 sequels, Stargate: The Ark of Truth and Stargate: Continuum. "Camelot" was the first Stargate SG-1 season finale since "Revelations" that was not intended to be the SG-1 series finale, and the first one since "Exodus" that was a cliffhanger. The episode was written without the knowledge that Stargate SG-1 would be picked up for a tenth season.

Release and reception

The Sci Fi Channel cut the opening sequences of the first ten episodes of the season from sixty to ten seconds for the original broadcast. The sequence only displayed the "Stargate SG-1" logo and a "Created by" credit, main cast credits were displayed during the teaser. Fans had been very negative about this move. British Sky One only aired the first part of "Avalon" with the short opening sequence.

The highest rated Season 9 episode was the season premier two-parter "Avalon" with a household rating of 2.1 each, and held steady between 1.8 and 2.0 until the midseason finale "The Fourth Horseman", which finished with 1.8. The second part of the season oscillated between 1.6 and 1.9 and finished with a household rating of 1.9. The season rating average was 1.8. A review in TV Guide Special #67 considered Mitchell's introduction in "Avalon" still too reminiscent of the production team's own efforts to turn around the Season Eight finale. Although the review embraced Black's "sparky, sarky characterization of Vala" during Amanda Tapping's absence, the renewed encounter between former Farscape cast members Ben Browder and Claudia Black was "oddly ... underplayed". The review found a strong similarity of the last ten minutes of "Avalon" (Part 1) to Indiana Jones and the Last Crusade, and the set of the beginning of Part 2 as a "god-awful Merrie Olde England pastiche straight out of Monty Python and the Holy Grail." Plotting and technobabble were mentioned as other detrimental facets of Part 2.

The ninth season of Stargate SG-1 was nominated for several awards in 2006, but won none. "Origin" was nomininated for a Gemini Award in the category "Best Achievement in Make-Up", while both "Beachhead" and "Camelot" were nominated for "Best Visual Effects". "Camelot" was also nominated for a Gemini for "Best Sound in a Dramatic Series". Director of Photography Jim Menard was nominated for a Leo Award in the category "Best Cinematography in a Dramatic Series". Ben Browder and Claudia Black were nominated for a Saturn Award in the categories "Best Actor on Television" and "Best Supporting Actress on Television", respectively. Stargate SG-1 was also nominated in the Saturn category "Best Syndicated/Cable Television Series", but lost to  Battlestar Galactica, then in its second season.

Main cast

 Starring Ben Browder as Lt. Colonel Cameron Mitchell
 Amanda Tapping as Lt. Colonel Samantha Carter
 Christopher Judge as Teal'c
 With Beau Bridges as Major General Hank Landry
 And Michael Shanks as Dr. Daniel Jackson

Episodes

Episodes in bold are continuous episodes, where the story spans over 2 or more episodes.

Home releases

References

External links

 Season 9 on GateWorld
 Season 9 on IMDb
 Season 9 on TV.com
 

 09
2005 American television seasons
2006 American television seasons
SG-1 09
2005 Canadian television seasons
2006 Canadian television seasons